The World Confederation of Teachers (WCT) was a global union federation bringing together unions representing teachers.

The federation originated in 1963, when the International Federation of Employees in Public Service (INFEDOP), an affiliate of what became the World Confederation of Labour (WCL), established a section for teachers, the International Trade Union Council of Teachers.  In 1970, it became the "World Confederation of Teachers", and in 1973, it became independent of INFEDOP, affiliating directly to the WCL.

By 1979, the federation claimed an affiliated membership of 1,000,000 workers.  In 2006, the WCL merged into the new International Trade Union Confederation, and the WCT decided in March 2007 to merge into the Education International.

General Secretaries
1970s: Coen Damen
1987: Roger Denis
1996: Gaston De La Haye

References

Education trade unions
Global union federations
Trade unions established in 1963
Trade unions disestablished in 2007